Tecnological Design Institute of Scientific Instrument Engineering of the Siberian Branch of the RAS, TDI SIE SB RAS is a research institute in Novosibirsk, Russia. It was founded in 1962.

History

In 1991, the bureau was transformed into the Design and Technology Institute of Scientific Instrument Engineering.

At the beginning of 2002, 200 people worked at the organization, including 2 doctors of sciences and 9 candidates of sciences.

Activity
Laser technologies and high-resolution precision systems, measurement technology, optics of three-dimensional objects, smart problem-oriented non-destructive testing systems, vision systems, development and creation of products for the automotive, nuclear and mining industries, as well as products for railway transport, development of dimensional control systems.

The TDI SIE, together with the Institute of Automation and Electrometry, developed laser circular recording systems (photoplotters) CLWS-300 and CLWS-300M, which were exported to Italy, Germany and China.

Sources of income
According to the Novosibirsk Encyclopedia, published in 2003, the receipt of budget funds was insignificant (10–15%) and revenues mainly came from contracts with Russian and foreign organizations.

References

Design bureaus
Manufacturing companies based in Novosibirsk
Laser companies